Leucotmemis pleuraemata is a moth of the subfamily Arctiinae. It was described by George Hampson in 1898. It is found in Santa Catarina, Brazil and Argentina.

References

 

Leucotmemis
Moths described in 1898